The 2015 Estonian Figure Skating Championships took place between 20 and 21 December 2014 in Tallinn. Skaters competed in the disciplines of men's singles, ladies' singles, and ice dancing on the senior levels, junior, and novice levels.

Senior results

Men

Ladies

Ice dancing

Junior results
The 2015 Estonian Junior Figure Skating Championships took place between 7 and 8 February 2015 at the Tondiraba Jäähall in Tallinn.

Men

Ladies

Ice dancing

External links
 2015 Estonian Championships results
 2015 Estonian Junior Championships results

Estonian Figure Skating Championships
Figure Skating Championships
Estonian Figure Skating Championships, 2015
2014 in figure skating